National Lampoon's Vacation, sometimes referred to as simply Vacation, is a 1983 American road trip  comedy film directed by Harold Ramis starring Chevy Chase, Beverly D'Angelo, Imogene Coca, Randy Quaid, John Candy, and Christie Brinkley in her acting debut with special appearances by Eddie Bracken, Brian Doyle-Murray, Miriam Flynn, James Keach, Eugene Levy and Frank McRae. It tells the story of a family that goes on a cross-country trip to an amusement park as hilarious hi-jinks occur along the way. The screenplay was written by John Hughes on the basis of his short story "Vacation '58," which appeared in National Lampoon.

The film was a box-office hit, earning more than $60 million in the U.S. alone with an estimated budget of $15 million, and received positive reviews from critics.

As a result of its success, five sequels have been produced: European Vacation (1985), Christmas Vacation (1989), Vegas Vacation (1997), Christmas Vacation 2 (2003) and Vacation (2015). In 2000, readers of Total Film voted it the 46th greatest comedy film of all time.

Plot
Clark Griswold, wanting to spend more time with his wife Ellen and children Rusty and Audrey, decides to lead the family on a cross-country expedition from the Chicago suburbs to the southern California amusement park Walley World, billed as "America's Favorite Family Fun Park". Ellen wants to fly, but Clark insists on driving, so he can bond with his family. He has ordered a new car in preparation for the trip, but the dealer claims that it will not be ready for six weeks. Clark is forced to buy the 'Wagon Queen Family Truckster', an ugly, oversized station wagon, after the car he brought to trade in has been hauled away and crushed.

During the family's travels, they experience numerous mishaps, such as being tagged by vandals in St. Louis, Missouri. Clark aggravates a bartender in Dodge City, Kansas and is tantalized on numerous occasions by a beautiful young woman driving a flashy red Ferrari 308 GTS.

They stop in Coolidge, Kansas to visit Ellen's cousin Catherine and her husband Eddie, who foist cranky Aunt Edna and her mean dog Dinky on the Griswolds, asking them to drop her off at her son Norman's home in Phoenix.

After stopping at a decrepit and dirty campground in South Fork, Colorado for the night, Clark forgets to untie Dinky's leash from the rear bumper before driving off the next morning, killing the dog. A motorcycle cop pulls the Griswolds over and angrily lectures Clark over animal cruelty, but accepts Clark's apology. Edna learns of her dog's death and becomes more irate with Clark. Exiting Colorado, Ellen loses her bag which had her credit cards and Clark reports them as lost.

While Ellen and Clark argue during a drive between Utah and Arizona, they crash and become stranded in the desert near Monument Valley. Clark and Rusty have a bonding experience explaining why Clark wants to take this vacation. After setting off alone in the desert to look for help, Clark eventually reunites with his family, who have been rescued and taken to a local mechanic. The mechanic extorts Clark's remaining cash only to render the car barely operational. Frustrated, they stop at the Grand Canyon. When Clark is unable to convince a hotel clerk to cash a personal check because his credit cards have mistakenly been reported lost, he raids the cash register behind the clerk's back and leaves the check.

Leaving, they find that Aunt Edna has died in her sleep. They tie her corpse to the roof of the car, wrapped in a tarpaulin. Discovering that Norman is out of town when they arrive at his home, they attach a note to the corpse and leave it in his backyard. Ellen becomes annoyed at Clark's hasty, halfhearted attempt at a eulogy.

Overwhelmed by the mishaps they have encountered during the road trip, Ellen and the children want to go back home, but Clark has become obsessed with reaching Walley World and they continue on. After an argument with Ellen, Clark eventually meets the Ferrari-driving blonde at a hotel bar and goes skinny-dipping with her in its pool, but they are discovered by the family before anything intimate happens. Ellen forgives Clark and they go skinny-dipping themselves.

Despite the family's misfortunes, they finally arrive at Walley World the next day only to discover the park closed for the next two weeks for repairs. Finally slipping into madness and realizing that all his efforts have been for nothing, Clark buys a realistic-looking BB gun and demands that park security guard Russ Lasky take them through Walley World. Ellen and the kids follow, attempting to placate Clark. Eventually, an LAPD SWAT team arrives and just as the family is about to be arrested, the park owner Roy Walley appears. Roy understands Clark's impassioned longing to achieve the perfect vacation, bringing back memories of his own family vacation headaches. He decides not to file criminal charges against the Griswolds and lets the family – along with the SWAT team – enjoy the park as his guests.

A montage of snapshots taken during the trip is shown during the credits, ending with one that shows the Griswolds flying back to Chicago.

Cast
 Chevy Chase as Clark W. Griswold, the patriarch of the Griswold Family.
 Beverly D'Angelo as Ellen Griswold, the wife of Clark.
 Anthony Michael Hall as Russell "Rusty" Griswold, the son of Clark and Ellen.
 Dana Barron as Audrey Griswold, the daughter of Clark and Ellen and the sister of Rusty.
 Imogene Coca as Aunt Edna, the aunt of Ellen.
 Randy Quaid as Cousin Eddie Johnson, the cousin-in-law of Clark and Ellen.
 John Candy as Russ Lasky, a security guard at Walley World.
 Christie Brinkley as the Girl in Red Ferrari
 Eddie Bracken as Roy Walley, the owner of Walley World.
 Brian Doyle-Murray as the Kamp Komfort clerk
 Miriam Flynn as Cousin Catherine Johnson, the cousin of Ellen and wife of Eddie.
 James Keach as the Motorcycle cop
 Eugene Levy as Ed, the car salesman.
 Frank McRae as Grover, a security guard at Walley World.
 Jane Krakowski as Cousin Vicki Johnson, the daughter of Eddie and Catherine.
 John P. Navin Jr. as Cousin Dale Johnson, the son of Eddie and Catherine and brother of Vicki.
 Violet Ramis (daughter of Harold Ramis) as Cousin Daisy Mabel Johnson, the daughter of Eddie and Catherine who was born without a tongue.
 Mickey Jones as Mechanic
 John Diehl as Assistant Mechanic
 James Staley as the hotel clerk 
 Popeye the Dog as Dinky (uncredited), a dog owned by Aunt Edna.

Harold Ramis has an offscreen voice cameo as one of the police officers at Walley World and provides the voice of the recorded message from Marty the Moose.

Production
During the Chicago Blizzard of 1979, writer John Hughes began developing a short story entitled "Vacation '58" for an issue of the National Lampoon. While the story ended up being bumped from the initial vacation-themed issue, it was eventually published in September 1979 and subsequently optioned by Warner Bros. "When I brought it to Hollywood, the first guy I brought it to was Jeff Katzenberg who was at Paramount," recalled producer Matty Simmons, who worked as a publisher at the National Lampoon. "He said it would never make a movie, it was too episodic, too consequential. I said, 'Yeah, it's a road trip. It's supposed to be episodic. You go from town to town, place to place.' But he didn’t like it, so then my agent brought it to Warner Brothers, and I met with them. Most of them said the same thing, but there was one executive over there—a guy named Mark Canton—who really pulled for it and it got made."

Upon Simmons' agreement with Warner Bros., Hughes was assigned the task of adapting his original story into a screenplay. Harold Ramis and Chevy Chase rewrote Hughes's first draft to place the story from the father's point of view rather than the son's.

Filming
Filming began on July 5, 1982, in Boone, Colorado, and lasted 55 days. Parts of the film were shot in Monument Valley, Utah; Flagstaff, Sedona, and the Grand Canyon in Arizona; Santa Anita Racetrack in Arcadia and Magic Mountain in California; Southern Colorado, and St. Louis, Missouri.

Walley World
In Hughes' original short story, the theme park was Disneyland. To avoid legal troubles, all of the names associated with Disneyland were altered to sound-alikes. For instance, the park became Walley World, itself a good-natured parody of the Anaheim location, and the mascot, Marty Moose, is reminiscent of Walt Disney's own Mickey Mouse.  Similarly, Roy Walley's appearance bears similarities to that of Disney and his name is similar to that of his brother Roy Disney.

In the film, the Walley World theme park is represented by Santa Anita Park in Arcadia, California and Six Flags Magic Mountain in Valencia, California. Santa Anita Park's large parking lot and blue-tinged fascia served as the exterior of Walley World, while all park interior scenes were shot at Magic Mountain. The two roller coasters seen in the film are La Revolución, which can be recognized by the vertical loop, and Colossus (currently Twisted Colossus), the double-track wooden roller coaster.

The movie's popularity gave rise to an ongoing cultural running gag of using the name "Wally World" (spelled as "Wally" without an "e") as a nickname for real-life retailer Walmart.

Wagon Queen Family Truckster

The Wagon Queen Family Truckster station wagon was created specifically for the film. It is based on a 1983 Ford LTD Country Squire station wagon. The car was designed by George Barris, and it lampooned American cars of the late 1970s. The Truckster features a "metallic pea" green paint scheme, extensive imitation wood-paneling decals, eight headlights (the second pair was taken from another Crown Victoria/Country Squire and mounted upside-down above the stock pair), a grille area largely covered by bodywork with only two small openings close to the bumper, an oddly-placed fuel filler door and an airbag made from a trashcan liner.

Music
The musical score for National Lampoon's Vacation was composed by Ralph Burns, featuring original songs by Lindsey Buckingham. A soundtrack album was released in 1983 by Warner Bros. Records. While the album did not chart, Buckingham's single "Holiday Road" reached number 82 on the Billboard Hot 100.

 "Holiday Road" – Lindsey Buckingham
 "Mister Blue" – The Fleetwoods
 "Blitzkrieg Bop" – Ramones
 "Deep River Blues" – Ralph Burns
 "Summer Hearts" – Nicolette Larson
 "Little Boy Sweet" – June Pointer
 "The Trip (Theme from Vacation)" – Ralph Burns
 "He's So Dull" – Vanity 6
 "Christie's Song" – Ralph Burns
 "Dancin' Across the USA" – Lindsey Buckingham

Release

Home media

National Lampoon's Vacation was first released on VHS, Betamax, Laserdisc, and CED in late 1983. It was later released again on VHS in 1986, 1991, 1995 and 1999. It was first released on DVD in 1997. The DVD was presented in an open-matte full screen presentation. Its only feature was the film's theatrical trailer. A 20th anniversary DVD was released in 2003. It included an anamorphic widescreen transfer. Its bonus features included an audio commentary with director Harold Ramis, producer Matty Simmons, and stars Chevy Chase, Anthony Michael Hall, Dana Barron, and Randy Quaid. It also included an introduction with Chase, Simmons, and Quaid, a family truckster interactive featurette gallery, and the film's theatrical trailer. A Blu-ray was released in 2013. It included the same features from the 20th Anniversary DVD and included the A&E documentary: Inside Story: National Lampoon's Vacation.

Reception

Box office
National Lampoon's Vacation opened theatrically in 1,175 venues on July 29, 1983, and earned $8,333,358 in its opening weekend, ranking number one at the domestic box office. The film grossed $61,399,552.

Critical response
National Lampoon's Vacation received positive reviews from critics. On review aggregator website Rotten Tomatoes, the film holds a 93% rating based on 44 reviews. The site's consensus reads, "Blessed by a brilliantly befuddled star turn from Chevy Chase, National Lampoon's Vacation is one of the more consistent – and thoroughly quotable – screwball comedies of the 1980s." Metacritic reports a 55 out of 100 rating based on 13 critics, indicating "mixed or average reviews". Audiences polled by CinemaScore gave the film an average grade of "C+" on an A+ to F scale; the company's founder, Ed Mintz, said in 2016, "I loved it ... I couldn't figure out for anything why people didn't love that more".

Janet Maslin of The New York Times gave the film a positive review, saying, "National Lampoon's Vacation, which is more controlled than other Lampoon movies have been, is careful not to stray too far from its target. The result is a confident humor and throwaway style that helps sustain the laughs – of which there are quite a few." Entertainment magazine Variety called the film "an enjoyable trip through familiar comedy landscapes" and praised "director Harold Ramis for populating the film with a host of well-known comedic performers in passing parts." Conversely, Richard Rayner of Time Out magazine said, "The visual gags come thick and fast, and are about as subtly signposted as the exit markers on a freeway. An exercise in the comedy of humiliation which is the stuff of shamefaced giggles."

References

External links

 
 
 
 
 
 "Vacation '58" by John Hughes (online text)

1983 films
1980s English-language films
1980s adventure comedy films
1980s black comedy films
1980s comedy road movies
American satirical films
American adventure comedy films
American black comedy films
American comedy road movies
1980s satirical films
Films about vacationing
Films based on short fiction
Films directed by Harold Ramis
Films set in Arizona
Films set in California
Films set in Colorado
Films set in Illinois
Films set in Kansas
Films set in Missouri
Films set in Chicago
Films set in amusement parks
Films shot in Utah
Films shot in Arizona
Films shot in California
Films shot in Missouri
National Lampoon's Vacation (film series)
Films with screenplays by John Hughes (filmmaker)
Warner Bros. films
Films shot in St. Louis
1983 comedy films
Films shot in Colorado
Films shot in Los Angeles County, California
Films set in St. Louis
Films set in Utah
1980s American films
Films shot in Monument Valley